The 2021–22 UConn Huskies men's basketball team represented the University of Connecticut in the 2021–22 NCAA Division I men's basketball season. The Huskies are led by fourth-year head coach Dan Hurley in the team's second season since their return to the Big East Conference. The Huskies played their home games at the Harry A. Gampel Pavilion in Storrs, Connecticut and the XL Center in Hartford, Connecticut. They finished the season 23–10, 13–6 in Big East play to finish in third place. They defeated Seton Hall in the quarterfinals to advance to the semifinals of the Big East tournament where they lost to Villanova. They received an at-large bid to the NCAA tournament as the No. 5 seed in the West Region, where they were upset in the First Round by New Mexico State.

Previous season
In a season limited due to the ongoing COVID-19 pandemic, the Huskies finished the season 15–8, 11–6 in Big East play to finish in third place. They defeated DePaul in the quarterfinals of the Big East tournament before losing Creighton in the semifinals. They received an at-large bid to the NCAA tournament as the No. 7 seed in the East Region. They were eliminated by Maryland in the First Round.

Offseason

Departures

2021 recruiting class

2022 Recruiting class

Roster

Schedule and results
The Huskies game against Providence on January 15, 2022 was canceled due to COVID-19 protocols at Providence.
|-
!colspan=12 style=|Non-conference regular season

|-
!colspan=12 style=|Big East regular season

|-
!colspan=9 style="|Big East tournament

|-
!colspan=9 style=|NCAA tournament

Source

Rankings

*AP does not release post-NCAA Tournament rankings.^Coaches do not release a Week 1 poll.

Awards and honors

Big East Conference honors

All-Big East First Team
R. J. Cole
Adama Sanogo

Big East All-Freshman Team
Jordan Hawkins

Source

References

UConn Huskies men's basketball seasons
Connecticut
Connecticut Huskies men's basketball
Connecticut Huskies men's basketball
Connecticut